Marta María Stephensen (1770–1805), was an Icelandic writer. 

She was married to Stefán Stephensen, the county governor of Vesturamt from 1790–1806. She published a cookery book in 1800, and is regarded as the first published female author in Iceland.

Sources 
Einfaldt Matreidslu Vasa-Qver, fyrir heldri manna Húss-freyjur / Utgefid af Frú Assessorinnu Mørtu Maríu Stephensen. Leirárgörðum við Leirá, 1800.
Saga Jóns Espólíns hins fróða. Kaupmannahöfn, 1895.
Hallgerður Gísladóttir. Íslensk matarhefð. Mál og menning, Reykjavík, 1999.
Pocket Cookbook. Einfalt matreiðsluvasakver (1800, first published Icelandic cookbook) (Digital)

Marta Maria Stephensen
1805 deaths
1770 births
Marta Maria Stephensen
Marta Maria